Whittier Heights is a neighborhood in Seattle, Washington. It is considered part of greater Ballard.

The neighborhood is bounded to the west by 15th Avenue NW, beyond which is Loyal Heights; to the north by NW 85th Street, beyond which is Crown Hill; to the east by 8th Avenue NW, beyond which is Greenwood and Phinney Ridge; and to the south by NW 65th Street, beyond which is central Ballard.

References